The fourth season of Chicago P.D., an American police drama television series with executive producer Dick Wolf, and producers Derek Haas, Michael Brandt, and Matt Olmstead, premiered September 21, 2016 and concluded on May 17, 2017. The season contained 23 episodes.

Cast

Regular
 Jason Beghe as Sergeant Henry "Hank" Voight
 Jon Seda as Senior Detective Antonio Dawson (episode 1-8)
 Sophia Bush as Detective Erin Lindsay
 Jesse Lee Soffer as Detective Jay Halstead
 Patrick John Flueger as Officer Adam Ruzek
 Marina Squerciati as Officer Kim Burgess (episode 1-19 and episode 20-23 credit only)
 LaRoyce Hawkins as Detective Kevin Atwater
 Amy Morton as Desk Sergeant Trudy Platt
 Elias Koteas as Undercover Senior Detective Alvin Olinsky

Recurring
 Samuel Hunt as Greg "Mouse" Gerwitz
 Barbara Eve Harris as Commander Emma Crowley
 Markie Post as Barbara "Bunny" Fletcher
 Chris Agos as Assistant State's Attorney Steve Kot
 Esai Morales as Chief Lugo
 Nick Wechsler as Detective Kenny Rixton
 Li Jun Li as Officer Julie Tay
 Jules Willcox as Nicole Silver
 Kevin Kane as Officer Mike Sorensen
 Ian Bedford as Commander Ed Fogel
 Tony Crane as Jimmy Sanguinetti
 Tracy Spiridakos as Detective Hailey Upton

Special guest star
 Billy Burke as Jake McCoy
 Arthur-Angelo Sarinas as Loo

Crossover
 Jesse Spencer as CFD Lieutenant Matthew Casey
 Taylor Kinney as CFD Lieutenant Kelly Severide
 Monica Raymund as CFD Paramedic Gabriela Dawson
 Eamonn Walker as CFD Battalion Chief Wallace Boden
 David Eigenberg as CFD Firefighter Christopher Herrmann
 Yuri Sardarov as CFD Firefighter Brian "Otis" Zvonecek
 Christian Stolte as CFD Firefighter Randy "Mouch" McHolland
 Kara Killmer as CFD Paramedic in Charge Sylvie Brett
 Nick Gehlfuss as Dr. Will Halstead
 Torrey DeVitto as Dr. Natalie Manning
 Yaya DaCosta as Nurse April Sexton
 Rachel DiPillo as Dr. Sarah Reese
 Colin Donnell as Dr. Connor Rhodes
 Brian Tee as Dr. Ethan Choi
 Marlyne Barrett as Nurse Maggie Lockwood
 S. Epatha Merkerson as Sharon Goodwin
 Oliver Platt as Dr. Daniel Charles
 Carl Weathers as State's Attorney Mark Jefferies
 Philip Winchester as Assistant State's Attorney Peter Stone
 Jon Seda as Chief Investigator Antonio Dawson
 Monica Barbaro as Assistant State's Attorney Anna Valdez
 Deanna Reed-Foster as Tina Cantrell
 Nora Dunn as Dr. Richardson

Episodes

Production

Casting
Li Jun Li joins the cast as Officer Julie Tay for a three episode guest spot. She is set to replace Brian Geraghty's character Officer Sean Roman as Officer Kim Burgess' (Marina Squerciati) partner, after he left the series at the end of last season. On September 28, it was reported that Jon Seda as character Antonio Dawson would move from P.D. to Justice, where Antonio  became an investigator for the SA's office. It was further reported on October 5 that Seda's last episode of P.D. would be episode 8.

Nick Wechsler joins the cast as Kenny Rixton, a former protégé of Voight's, for a multi-episode arc. On February 7, 2017, it was revealed that Esai Morales join the cast as Chief Lugo, a veteran of the Police Department who is trying to steer the CPD into a new style of policing. His first appearance was in the three-way crossover with Chicago Fire and Chicago Justice, before recurring throughout the remainder of the season.

Set to recur as Hailey Upton, a robbery homicide Detective, Tracy Spiridakos joins the cast, with her first episode slated to air in early May. Squerciati took maternity leave from the show in March 2017, and Kim made her temporary departure in "Last Minute Resistance".

Crossovers

A crossover starting on Chicago Fire and concluding on Chicago PD aired on January 3, 2017.

A three-way crossover between Chicago Fire, Chicago PD and the premiere of Chicago Justice aired on March 1, 2017, with heavy involvement from Chicago Med.

Ratings

Home media

References

External links
 
 

2016 American television seasons
2017 American television seasons
Chicago P.D. (TV series) seasons